Gim Gyo-gak (696–794), or Jin Qiaojue in Mandarin, also known by his Buddhist name Jijang, was a Korean Buddhist monk believed to be the manifestation of Ksitigarbha at Mount Jiuhua, one of the four sacred mountains of Chinese Buddhism, located in Anhui province, China.

Gim Gyo-gak was a Silla prince, who became interested in Buddhism when visiting Tang China at the age of 24. Upon returning to Silla, he decided to become a monk. In 719, he returned to China to cultivate himself at Mount Jiuhua. He died in 794 in Mount Jiuhua, at the age of 99. The monks there believed that Ksitigarbha was reincarnated in him. Mount Jiuhua thereafter became the sacred site of Ksitigarbha.

References

Mount Jiuhua
Tang dynasty Buddhist monks
Silla people
Korean Buddhist monks
Korean emigrants to China
696 births
794 deaths
Kṣitigarbha